The Short Mountain Creek Bridge carries Short Mountain Road across Short Mountain Creek, northwest of Paris, Arkansas. It was built in 1928 by the Virginia Bridge Company of Tennessee, and is the only bridge of this type in the area.

The bridge was listed on the National Register of Historic Places in 2004.

See also
National Register of Historic Places listings in Logan County, Arkansas
List of bridges on the National Register of Historic Places in Arkansas

References

Road bridges on the National Register of Historic Places in Arkansas
National Register of Historic Places in Logan County, Arkansas
Bridges completed in 1928
Buildings and structures in Paris, Arkansas
Parker truss bridges in the United States
Transportation in Logan County, Arkansas
1928 establishments in Arkansas